Blood Angels may refer to
 An alternate name of Thralls (film), a 2004 horror film
 In the fictional setting of Warhammer 40,000, a Space Marines Chapter.

See also 
 Blutengel (Blood Angel), a German musical group